Rudboda is a neighborhood in Lidingö Municipality, Sweden, with some 3,000 inhabitants. Rudboda is dominated by single-family houses. The neighborhood has one school and a shopping square. There was a church, which has now been desecrated. Rudboda also contain Bosön, a large sports complex, and the headquarters of the Swedish Sports Confederation.

Lidingö Municipality
Neighbourhoods in Sweden